Hy-Line International or Hy-Line is an multi-national genetics company that raises and sells commercial/industrial laying chickens. It ist part of the German EW Group. The firm has subsidiaries in the US, the UK, Brazil and Japan, and 60 distributors in more than 50 countries worldwide.

As part of its international expansion, in 2008, the company launched a UK division called Hy-Line International UK, that handles production and distribution in the UK, Europe and other areas worldwide.

Corporate
The firm is privately owned. Its president is Jonathan Cade;  Thomas Dixon serves as the firm's director of  international sales and marketing

Operations
Hy-Line directly operates subsidiaries in the United Kingdom, Italy, Brazil, South Africa and Australia (Hy-Line Australia). Many of its subsidiaries were formerly distributors bought out by Hy-Line, including Hy-Line Italia (formerly Valversa) and Hy-Line South Africa (formerly Hy-Line Chicks). In several companies it has instead signed exclusivity deals with distributors. In India, Amrit Group distributes Hy-Line chickens since July 2014 when a new 'poultry hub' was established as part of plans to capture 30% of the Indian egg-laying market by 2017–2018. Sales in Vietnam are exclusively licensed to the Ba Haun Company since 2013.

Products

Products of the company include the Hy-Line W-36, Brown, and Silver Brown lines.

Criticism
Hy-Line International came under fire in September 2009 from animal rights group Mercy for Animals following the release of a video alleged to have been filmed inside of a Hy-Line hatchery, showing the process of chick culling. The video went viral and received widespread media attention across the English speaking world. However it is a generally accepted practice and considered a humane method of dispatching.

Hy-Line Australia was sued in 2013 for unsafe practices at its chicken hatchery at Huntly near Bendigo, VIC after a fire in one of its sheds in April, 2009 left an employee trapped due to lack of fire exits. The man escaped by breaking through floorboards. The case was settled out of court two days later for an undisclosed sum.

Sponsorships
Hy-Line Australia is the name-sponsor of the Hy-Line Australia Oval, which is a home ground of the Heathcote District Football League. It also sponsors the Hy-Line International Research Award of the Poultry Science Association.

See also
 American Veterinary Medical Association
 American Association of Avian Pathologists
 Poultry Science Association
 ISA Brown

References

External links
 Hy-Line International
 Hy-Line UK division

Poultry farming in the United States
Companies based in Iowa
Poultry companies
Agriculture companies of the United States